The 2012 European championships of international draughts were held from 16 to 22 September in Emmen, Netherlands over 9 rounds Swiss-system tournament. There were 68 participants from 25 countries, including, 24 grandmasters, 9 international masters and 12 masters of the FMJD.

The winner was Alexei Chizhov from Russia, silver was for Guntis Valneris from Latvia, third was Pim Meurs from the Netherlands.

Results

External links 
 The results of the championship on the page from the Dutch draughts federation

2012 in draughts
European championships international draughts
2012 in Dutch sport
International sports competitions hosted by the Netherlands
September 2012 sports events in Europe
Sports competitions in Emmen, Netherlands